Andrew Garth is a British diplomat and was the British Ambassador to Slovakia from October 2014 to August 2020.

Career

Garth joined the Foreign & Commonwealth Office (FCO) in 1988 and has held several appointments in Europe and Asia including Poland, Romania, Thailand and Taiwan. He led the EU Enlargement and Pre-accession Team at the FCO and assisted British businesses both in the UK and Overseas.

Garth was appointed as Her Majesty's Ambassador to the Slovak Republic replacing Chargé d’Affaires Gill Fraser and took up office on 1 October 2014. He presented credentials to President Andrej Kiska during a ceremony on 18 September 2014. He will leave the role in August 2020, to be succeeded by Nigel Baker, and transfer to another diplomatic post. In 2021 he took a government affairs job at ESET, a Slovak security software business.

References

Ambassadors of the United Kingdom to Slovakia
Living people
Year of birth missing (living people)